Benedikt David Arnstein (15 October 1765 – 6 January 1841), also known by the pen name Arenhof, was an Austrian playwright. He is considered the first German-language Jewish dramatist and poet.

Biography
Benedikt Arnstein was born in Vienna into a prominent Jewish banking family, the son of wholesaler David Isaak Arnstein. His grandfather was the prominent banker Adam Isaac von Arnstein (son of ), and his aunt the socialite Fanny von Arnstein.

He began working at his grandfather's banking house in 1782, but left in 1786 to undertake a series of travels across Germany, France, Spain and Italy.

Apart from individual poems, which appeared in monographs and almanacs, Arnstein published numerous dramatic works, some of which were performed at the Burgtheater in Vienna. His 1782 work Einige jüdische Familienscenen celebrated the Edict of Tolerance of Emperor Joseph II.

Publications

References
 

1765 births
1840 deaths
18th-century Austrian poets
18th-century dramatists and playwrights
18th-century Jews
19th-century Austrian dramatists and playwrights
19th-century Austrian Jews
19th-century Austrian poets
Austrian male dramatists and playwrights
Austrian male poets
Jewish Austrian writers
Jewish dramatists and playwrights
Jewish poets
Jews and Judaism in Vienna
Writers from Vienna